Lily Hope is an Alaska Native artist, designer, teacher, weaver, Financial Freedom planner, and community facilitator. She is primarily known for her skills at weaving customary Northwestern clothing such as Chilkat robes and ensembles. She had a collaborative studio in downtown Juneau with Ricky Tagaban. Her larger studio, called Wooshkindein Da.àat: Lily Hope Weaver Studio opened downtown in 2022.

Biography and education 
Lily Hope (born in 1983), also known as Lily Lalanya Hudson, was born and raised in Juneau, Alaska by full-time artists. She mainly identifies herself as Tlingit Indian of the Raven moiety from her grandmother's clan, the T’akdeintaan. The clan originated from Snail House in Hoonah, Alaska. Her Lingít name is Wooshkindein Da.àat. Her mother, Clarissa Rizal, and artist Kay Parker], both well-known and also from Juneau, Alaska, taught her how to weave.

Clarissa Rizal (Tlingit, 1956–2016) was a weaver, painter, printmaker, carver, and sculptor. She was one of the last apprentices of the late master Chilkat weaver, Jennie Thlanaut (1891-1986). In the 1990s, Jennie Thlunaut was one of very few artists who still created Chilkat weaving. Jennie's knowledge of formline design was so thorough that she was able to create her own designs that followed those aesthetic rules. She taught this to Clarissa, who in turn taught Hope how to weave in formline style. Hope's ties with her mother were strong to the point that they collaborated on an ensemble and won first place at an art show.

Hope studied communications and theater at University of Alaska Southeast from 2002 to 2007. Soon after college, she became a well-known Chilkat and Raventail weaver and teacher. She also acted and participated in the Alaskan Regional theater, Perseverance Theatre, whose mission is to “create professional theatre by and for Alaskans." They valued community engagement, cross-cultural collaboration, professional rigor, and regional voice. This ties in with Hope's commitment and dedication to her hometown. 

She teaches weaving in Juneau, Yukon Territory, and down the coast of southeast Alaska. She is also a mother of five children.

Artworks  
Copper Child (2012) was her first Ravenstail ensemble, in which she collaborated with her mother Clarissa Rizal. It is made from Merino wool, rabbit fur, sea otter fur, and copper cones. It includes a robe, headdress, and apron. It fits a child. Its intent is for celebrations. It contains standing at the top of the mountain pattern repeating across the body of the robe, with Hope's 2002 design, shaman eyes, and Clarissa's traditional lightning and Haida spider web designs. It had a run of exhibits and shows and won first place at Sealake Heritage Institute's Juried Art Show in 2012. It now holds a permanent spot in its collection.

Little Watchman (2014) is a child-size Chilkat ensemble that includes a headdress, leggings, a wool jacket adorned with epaulets and a Chilkat face on the back. It exemplifies the mix of Ravenstail and Chilkat textiles. Chilkat robes used modified Northwest Coast form line, and she weaves them by hand on an upright frame with no tools other than a tapestry needle to tuck in braids. And it is on display in the exhibition Reflections: Native Arts Across Generations at the Fralin Museum of Art. This exhibition's purpose was to bring together historic Native American art that was drawn from the collections of the Fralin Museum of Art with the work of several distinguished contemporary Native artists.

Lineage Robe (2017) thigh-spun Merino wool, cedar bark, hand-dyed merino wool, beaver fur is part of the collection of the Portland Art Museum. In the Northwest Coast, such as Alaska, British Columbia, Washington, the tribes believe in human and animal interactions were strong enough to the point that they could switch with each other. The Chilkat blanket is a woven cape, worn by high-ranking tribal members during civic and ceremonial occasions. Only the wealthy could make or own. Both men and women contributed to the process of creating the blanket. Men would design the pattern while the women would provide the cedar bark. It was considered a great privilege. The standard design is a white background with a bold black border and fringe on the lower portion. This also consisted of the formline style, which is a primary design from the Northwest. It consisted of darkly outlined shapes called ovoids. Ovoids are U or V-shapes. The blankets are in black, white, or red colors. But on this occasion, Hope mainly used the traditional designs of a Chilkat blanket but added in color to it to modernize it.

Heritage Robe (2017) it is her first adult-size Chilkat robe. It took her 17 months, from 2016 to 2017, and over 1,700 hours at her loom. It is one of four robes in the exhibition at Portland Art Museum, in Portland Oregon that are connected by the same teaching lineage. It mainly holds the same outlined shapes and characteristics from the Lineage Robe. Hope worked on the robe at SHI's Delores Churchill Artist-in-Residence Studio. While she was working on the project, her mother, Clarissa Rizal, passed away. The intention of the robe, according to Hope, is to help build an awareness and recognition of Chilkat weaving on a global scale. Not only that but children and grandchildren could learn more about their ancestry.

Giving Strength Robe (2019) 5-inch-by-5-inch squares to create a traditional indigenous robe. This is a collaboration with many Chilkat and Ravenstail weavers from all over North America. The concept originally came from Heidi Vantrease, the project organizers include Hope, Deanna Lampe, and Ursala Hudson. Ursala Hudson is Hope's sister who is an artist and a graphic designer who photographs and paints. She is also a mother and contributes to society by working as President and one of the founders of Pagosa Peak Open School, the community's charter school. The intention is to bring weavers together to bring in strength and for survivors to be able to heal. The completed robe will be given to Aiding Women in Abuse and Rape Emergencies (AWARE), Juneau's gender-inclusive shelter for survivors of gender-based violence. This project was mildly based on Clarissa Rizal's “Weavers Across the Water's robe”, which also brought weavers together to create a robe to fight for a cause.

Exhibitions
 "Sharing Honors and Burdens: Renwick Invitational 2023," Renwick Gallery Smithsonian Institution. May 26, 2023 - March 31, 2024.
 "Exhibit On The History Of Northern Northwest Coast Weaving," Alaska State Museum. May 1- October 10, 2020.
 "Reflections: Native Arts Across Generations," The Fralin Museum of Art. May 24, 2018 - January 27, 2019.
 “The Art of Resilience: The Continuum of Tlingit Art," Portland Art Museum. 2016 - 2017.
 "Interwoven Radiance, Center for Contemporary Native Art," Portland Art Museum. November 10, 2017 – June 24, 2018

Collections 
Lily Hope's work is included in the following public collections.
 Portland Art Museum, Portland, OR
 The Fralin Museum of Art, Charlottesville, VA
 Sealaska Heritage Institute, Juneau, AK

Awards 
 2022 Artist-in-Residence at Institute of American Indian Arts, January 20 - Feb 8 2022  
 2021 SHIFT award from Native Arts and Cultures Foundation “Protecting the Material Sovereignty of Our Indigenous Homelands" ” 
 2018 Mentor Artist Fellowship
 2017 Bill Holm Research Grant
2012 Sealaska Heritage Institute's Juried Art Show

See also 
 Ursala Hudson
 Northwest Coast art
 Indigenous peoples of the Northwest Coast
 Indigenous textile art of the Americas

External links
 Lily Hope, official website

References 

1983 births
Living people
Native American women artists
21st-century American women artists
Tlingit people
Native American textile artists
American weavers
Women textile artists